George C. Claussen (August 6, 1882 – December 18, 1948) was a justice of the Iowa Supreme Court from October 21, 1932, to December 4, 1932, and again from April 17, 1933, to December 3, 1934, appointed from Clinton County, Iowa.

References

External links
Iowa Judicial Branch Past Iowa Supreme Court Justices page for George C. Claussen

Justices of the Iowa Supreme Court
1882 births
1948 deaths
20th-century American judges